Funko Inc. is an American company that manufactures licensed and limited pop culture collectibles, best known for its licensed vinyl figurines and bobbleheads. In addition, the company produces licensed plush, action figures, apparel, accessories and games. Founded in 1998 by Mike Becker and Claudia Becker, Funko was originally conceived as a small project to create various low-tech, nostalgia-themed toys. The company's first manufactured bobblehead was of the Big Boy mascot, the well-known restaurant advertising icon.

Sold in 2005, Funko, LLC, is now headed by CEO Andrew Perlmutter. Since then, the company has increased the scope of its toy lines and signed licensing deals with major companies such as Warner Bros., Nickelodeon, MTV, NBCUniversal, Disney, Marvel Entertainment, and Major League Baseball.

History 

Funko was founded in 1998 by toy collector Mike Becker at his home in Snohomish, Washington. He started the business after failing to find an affordable coin bank of the Big Boy Restaurants mascot, instead licensing the rights to make his own coin banks from a Big Boy franchise in Michigan. The coin banks failed to sell and the franchise filed for bankruptcy protection, but Funko remained in business after licensing the rights to bobbleheads for Austin Powers, which sold 80,000 units. After this, some of the first characters that Funko sold were the Grinch, Tony the Tiger, and Cheerios mascot, the honeybee. In 2005, Becker sold Funko to its current Chief Creative Officer, Brian Mariotti, who moved its offices to Lynnwood, Washington, and significantly expanded the company's licensed product lines. In 2011, Funko began selling their Pop! Vinyl line of figurines. By 2012, the company had sold more than $20 million worth of merchandise.

The company was sold to Fundamental Capital, a private equity firm, in 2013 to raise funds. ACON Investments, LLC announced in late 2015 that it had acquired Funko from Fundamental Capital, LLC, but would keep current staff and the head of company.

By 2016, it had outgrown its original headquarters in Everett and announced plans to move into a downtown building with more space and a retail store. Funko acquired British toymaker Underground Toys, also its European distributor, in early 2017. Funko opened its new headquarters and  flagship store in downtown Everett on August 19, 2017. Funko was listed on the NASDAQ stock exchange on November 2, 2017, but suffered the worst initial public offering of the 21st century, with shares falling by 40 percent and only raising $125 million.

In May 2019, Funko acquired the fashion accessories line, Loungefly.

The company opened its second storefront in November 2019, located in Hollywood, Los Angeles. It has  of space and includes life-size statues and movie "sets".

In June 2022, Funko acquired Mondo, a high-end pop culture company.

In March 2023, Funko announced that an excess of old inventory would be disposed of due to limited warehouse capacity.

Production 
Products are designed at the Funko headquarters in Everett, Washington, and in other locations throughout the U.S. New figures are designed with input from licensors, in-studio artists, and fans through social media. Funko artists use ZBrush to create digital models that are revised before being made into prototype sculptures, which are sent for approval from manufacturers and licensors. The completed figures are manufactured at factories in China and Vietnam.

Product lines 
Funko has produced thousands of products across dozens of different toy lines since its inception. The first, Wacky Wobblers, was a line of bobbleheads depicting various characters, mainly from popular culture, such as Betty Boop, Cap'n Crunch, and The Cat in the Hat. The company's mascot, a recurring character in the Funko franchise, is Freddy Funko, who was introduced in the year of 2002.

Funko's Pop! Vinyl line are figures modelled in a style similar to the Japanese chibi style. The figures have large squarish heads, disproportionately small bodies, and large, circular black eyes. The figures typically depict licensed characters from franchises such as Doctor Who, Marvel, DC, Disney, Star Wars, Wizarding World, Dragon Ball, My Hero Academia and other pop culture entities. After a preview line of DC Comics characters were released at San Diego Comic-Con 2010, the original Funko Pop! line of products was fully revealed in 2011 at the New York Toy Fair.

The exaggerated body proportions of Pop! figures have invited comparisons with Good Smile’s Nendoroid figures, which are similarly described as "chibi". Both product lines depict characters from many different franchises.

Most Funko Pop! figures are not bobbleheads, as their heads do not move. However, all Star Wars figures in the line are bobbleheads, most Marvel figures, and all Genshin Impact figures, although the Genshin Impact packaging does not describe them as bobble-heads, but rather as figures, unlike Star Wars and Marvel. This is to avoid licensing conflicts with Hasbro and Good Smile Company respectively, the companies of which holds the license to make ordinary (non-bobblehead) figures of characters from these franchises.

Various other products have been released using the Pop! brand and its character stylization, such as plush toys, T-shirts, keychains (miniaturized versions of the normal figures), and ceramic mugs, the latter of which are enlarged, hollow copies of a figure's head, with a handle attached.

Within the Funko Pop! product line, there is a series known as Pop! Rides, featuring the Funko Pop figure in a vehicle. The Funko Pop! line also has figures that are larger than the standard figure, in 6-inch, 10-inch, 18-inch, and the now-retired 9-inch size. In addition, Funko produces Pop! Deluxes, where a character is seated on external set pieces, such as a throne, a vehicle, or creature. Funko has also begun creating Movie and Comic Moments, which feature posed Pop! figures interacting with each other and on display bases in ways that replicate moments from different movies and comic books. Funko has also created a line featuring artists with their album covers, this line can be found as Pop! Albums.

At Toy Fair 2019, Funko announced a new line of Pop! Vinyl figures; Pop! Town, initially including Ghostbusters, Scooby-Doo, SpongeBob SquarePants, and The Nightmare Before Christmas. This line includes a Pop! Vinyl figure alongside a stylized version of a landmark building from the source material.

Other Funko products currently on the market include a variety of collectible toy lines such as Vinyl Soda, Vinyl Gold, Mystery Minis, Popsies, Ad Icons and stuffed Plushies made to resemble their stylized array of toys. Funko also owns Loungefly, a line of collectible mini-bags and purses that feature popular characters and designs from franchises as diverse as Harry Potter, Hello Kitty and even Disney princesses, the latter of which are sold at official Disney stores and parks.

Funko product lines of the past that have since been discontinued or are no longer in production include Dorbz, VYNL, Rock Candy, Hikari, Spastik Plastik, Blox, FunkoVision, Funko Force, ReAction Figures Wacky Wisecracks and Wacky Wobblers.

Chase variants 
A chase variant is any Funko product within a series that is a rare variation on the original mold, originally at a ratio of 1/36 that has since increased to 1/6. This variance can be as simple as a color change, or as complex as a totally new mold. Common variances include different molds or character poses, a flocked (fuzzy) finish, metallic paint, glitter, and translucence. They are randomly inserted into shipments, and are highly sought after by collectors, often reselling for much higher prices.

Mystery Minis 
The Mystery Mini series consists of a group of blind boxes that have a random character within, from a variety of series. Examples of Mystery Mini series themes include Five Nights at Freddy's, Blizzard Entertainment's Cute but Deadly, Disney Heroes and Villains, Horror Classics, Asphalt 9: Legends, Steven Universe, Teenage Mutant Ninja Turtles, Mary Poppins, Avengers: Infinity War, and Anime Heroes And Vehicles. The figures are styled differently than the other Funko products. Unlike the other Funko products, there are not usually convention exclusives (the last ones were from 2014), but some stores, such as Hot Topic and FYE, have been known to carry exclusives.

Bitty Pop 
At the London Toy Fair in January 2023, Funko announced a new line of Pop! Vinyl figures; Bitty Pop! Bitty Pops are miniature versions of the beloved Funko Pops, measuring just 1 inch in size. Each package contains three standard figures and one mystery figure, all displayed in an acrylic case and priced at $14.99. The Bitty Pops are packaged in small Funko boxes. 

The initial Bitty line focuses on two popular franchises: Harry Potter and Disney. Harry Potter fans can look forward to seeing Hermione Granger, Ron Weasley, Draco Malfoy, Dumbledore, and Harry Potter in miniature form. The classic Disney lineup includes Minnie and Mickey Mouse, Daisy and Donald Duck, Chip and Dale, Pluto, and more.

Convention exclusives 

Funko has been offering convention exclusive versions of their products at various conventions such as San Diego Comic-Con, Emerald City Comic Con, New York Comic Con, Fan Expo, Star Wars Celebration, and E3. This started in 2006 at the San Diego Comic-Con.

Funko Games 
In February 2019, Funko acquired award-winning board game development studio Forrest-Pruzan Creative, including the design studio imprint Prospero Hall, forming Funko Games.  Funko Games has begun publishing strategy games across different licenses, including their flagship game Funkoverse.

Business model 
Funko has over 1,100 licenses with different companies. Another aspect of their business model is tracking the popularity of a certain item and knowing when to move on to a different character. Funko creates items that appeal to children and adults. This can be noted by their range of figures from Golden Girls to superheroes. Funko comes up with an initial design in 24 hours and can have a product from concept to shelf in 70 days. CCO Mariotti believes that the company's eagerness to gain so many licenses and have a range of products from music icons and video game characters to action heroes is what has made them succeed.

Collector box subscriptions 
In 2015, Funko and Marvel partnered to launch Marvel Collector Corps, a subscription box service featuring exclusive collectibles, apparel, and accessories. Boxes shipped every two months. It subsequently launched a subscription box service for Star Wars items called Smuggler's Bounty, a DC subscription box called Legion of Collectors, and a Disney subscription box called Disney Treasures. Also, the subscription box known as Loot Crate occasionally contains an exclusive Funko Pop! vinyl figure which aligns with each monthly box theme. Loot Crate has offered an exclusive Funko Pop! figure with its other products as well.

, Funko no longer offers these boxes through a subscription. The Collector Corps, which focuses on Marvel collectibles, is now available through Amazon. The Disney Treasures box, which focused on Disney collectibles, was available at Hot Topic, but ended in October 2019. Star Wars Smuggler's Bounty boxes were available through Amazon, but ended in December 2019.

Film 
A live action/animated hybrid film based on the Funko toys is in development at Warner Animation Group. The film was announced as being in active development on September 16, 2019, with directors Mark Dindal and Teddy Newton attached to the project. In February 2021, Newton was confirmed to write the screenplay, in addition to his directing duties.

See also

References

External links 

 

Toy companies of the United States
American companies established in 1998
Toy companies established in 1998
Manufacturing companies based in Washington (state)
1998 establishments in Washington (state)
Companies based in Everett, Washington
2017 initial public offerings
Companies listed on the Nasdaq